This is the discography of English record producer, singer, and bassist Trevor Horn.

Solo and related
 Trevor Horn/Lol Creme/Yiannis Kotsiras – "Pass the Flame", 2004 (single)
 Various artists – Produced by Trevor Horn, 2004 (compilation)
 The Producers – Made in Basing Street, 2012
 Trevor Horn – The Reflection Wave One—Original Soundtrack, 2017
 Trevor Horn – Reimagines the Eighties, 2019
 Trevor Horn – Reimagines the Eighties (Instrumentals), 2019

The Buggles
 The Age of Plastic, 1980
 Adventures in Modern Recording, 1981

Art of Noise
 Into Battle with the Art of Noise, 1983 (EP)
 Who's Afraid of the Art of Noise?, 1984
 Daft, 1986 (compilation)
 The Seduction of Claude Debussy, 1999
 Reduction, 2000
 Reconstructed, 2004
 Daft as a Brush!, 2019

Yes
 Drama, 1980 (band member, lead vocals)
 90125, 1983 (producer)
 Big Generator, 1987 (co-producer)
 Fly from Here, 2011 (producer)
 Fly from Here – Return Trip, 2018 (lead vocals, producer, mixer)

Production

1970s
 John Howard – "I Can Breathe Again", 1978 (single)
 John Howard – "Don't Shine Your Light", 1979 (single)
 Lips – "Say Hello To My Girl ", 1978 (single)
 Big A – "Caribbean Air Control",1978 (single)
 Big A – "Fly On UFO", 1978 (single)
 Chromium – Star to Star, (Horn: producer and songwriter, Geoff Downes: keyboards and songwriter, Hans Zimmer: electronics), 1979

1980s
 ABC – The Lexicon of Love, 1982
 Dollar – The Dollar Album ("Mirror Mirror", "Give Me Back My Heart", "Videotheque", "Hand Held in Black and White"), 1982
 Spandau Ballet – "Instinction" (co-producer), 1982 (single)
 Philip Jap – "Save Us", 1982 (single)
 The Korgis – "Don't Look Back", 1982 (single)
 Malcolm McLaren – Duck Rock, 1983
 Philip Jap – "Brain Dance", 1983 (single)
 Frankie Goes to Hollywood – Welcome to the Pleasuredome, 1984
 Band Aid – "Do They Know It's Christmas?", 1984 (12" version)
 Grace Jones – Slave to the Rhythm, 1985
 Propaganda – A Secret Wish, 1985
 Godley & Creme – "Cry", 1985 (single)
 Anne Pigalle – "Why Does It Have to Be This Way?", 1985 (single)
 Nasty Rox Inc. – Escape from New York (executive producer), 1988 (single)
 Act – "Chance", 1988 (single)
 The Mint Juleps – The Power of Six, 1988
 Pet Shop Boys – "Left to My Own Devices", 1988 (single)
 Pet Shop Boys – "It's Alright", 1989 (single)
 Simple Minds – Street Fighting Years, 1989
 Paul McCartney – Flowers in the Dirt ("Rough Ride", "Figure of Eight", "How Many People", "Ou est le Soleil?"), 1989
 Rod Stewart – "Downtown Train", 1989 (single)
 Rod Stewart – "This Old Heart of Mine" (co-producer), 1989 (single)

1990s
 Inga Humpe – "Riding Into Blue (Cowboy Song)", 1990 (single)
 David Coverdale – "The Last Note of Freedom", 1990 (single)
 Seal – "Crazy", 1990 (single)
 Seal – Seal, 1991
 Lomax – "Waiting in Vain", 1991 (single)
 Rod Stewart – "Rhythm of My Heart", 1991 (single)
 Rod Stewart – "Your Song", 1991 (Two Rooms: Celebrating the Songs of Elton John & Bernie Taupin)
 Marc Almond – Tenement Symphony, 1991
 Terry Reid – The Driver (four tracks), 1991
 Betsy Cook – "Docklands", 1992 (single)
 Mike Oldfield – Tubular Bells II, 1992
 Tori Amos – "The Happy Worker", 1992 (Toys Soundtrack)
 Barry Manilow – "Could It Be Magic '93 Remix", 1993 (single)
 Rod Stewart – Lead vocalist (five tracks), 1993
 The Pretenders – "I'm Not in Love", 1993 (single) (Indecent Proposal Soundtrack)
 Tom Jones – "If I Only Knew", 1994 (single)
 Seal – Seal II, 1994
 Cher – It's a Man's World ("The Sun Ain't Gonna Shine Anymore", "The Gunman", "Shape of Things to Come"), 1995
 Rod Stewart – A Spanner in the Works, 1995
 The Glam Metal Detectives – "Everybody Up!", 1995 (single)
 Pato Banton with Sting – "Sprits in the Material World", 1995 (single) (Ace Ventura: When Nature Calls Soundtrack)
 Shane MacGowan and Sinéad O'Connor – "Haunted", 1995 (single)
 Shane MacGowan and Máire Brennan – "You're the One", 1995 (single)
 Eddi Reader – "Nobody Lives Without Love", 1995 (single)
 Wendy & Lisa – "This Is the Life", 1995 (single)
 Tina Turner – Wildest Dreams ("Whatever You Want", "Missing You", "On Silent Wings", "Thief of Hearts", "In Your Wildest Dreams", "All Kinds of People", "Dancing in My Dreams"), 1996
 Gabrielle – "Forget About the World" (additional production and remix), 1996 (single)
 The Frames – Fitzcarraldo (four tracks), 1996
 Bryan Ferry – "Dance with Life (The Brilliant Light)", 1996 (single) (Phenomenon Soundtrack)
 Boyzone – "A Different Beat" (additional production and remix) (single), 1996
 The Pretenders – G.I. Jane Soundtrack ("Goodbye", "Homecoming"), 1997
 Public Demand – "Invisible", 1997 (single)
 Richard Marx & Donna Lewis – "At the Beginning", 1997 (single) (Anastasia Soundtrack)
 Gary Barlow – Open Road ("Hang on in There Baby"), 1997
 Malcolm McLaren presents Rakim – "Buffalo Gals Back to Skool", 1998 (single)
 Seal – Human Being, 1998
 Lee Griffiths – "Feeling the Strain", 1999 (single)
 David's Daughters – "Dreaming of Loving You", 1999 (single)
 Charlotte Church – "Just Wave Hello", 1999 (single)
 The Frames – Dance the Devil ("Pavement Tune", "God Bless Mom"), 1999
 Genesis – "The Carpet Crawlers", 1999 (single)

2000s
 Eros Ramazzotti – Stilelibero (three tracks), 2000
 LeAnn Rimes – Coyote Ugly Soundtrack (four tracks), 2000
 LeAnn Rimes – "Can't Fight the Moonlight", 2000 (single)
 Kelly Levesque – "Some Hearts", 2001 (single) (America's Sweethearts Soundtrack)
 Faith Hill – "There You'll Be", 2001 (single) (Pearl Harbor Soundtrack)
 Truth Hurts, David Elliot – Ali Soundtrack (two tracks), 2001
 t.A.T.u. – 200 km/h in the Wrong Lane ("All the Things She Said", "Not Gonna Get Us", "How Soon Is Now?"), 2002
 Yolanda Adams – "If We Could Remember", 2002 (The Sum of All Fears Soundtrack)
 Bryan Adams and Hans Zimmer – Spirit: Stallion of the Cimarron, (co-writer, "Sound the Bugle"), 2002
 Seal – Seal IV, 2003
 Lovefield – Vivid ("Vivid", "Beast", "King of the Universe"), 2003
 Texas – Careful What You Wish For ("Telephone X"), 2003
 Belle and Sebastian – Dear Catastrophe Waitress, 2003
 Various artists – Mona Lisa Smile Soundtrack, 2003
 Lisa Stansfield – The Moment, 2004
 Moya Brennan – "Tell Me Now (What You See)" (King Arthur Soundtrack) (co-producer), 2004
 G4 – G4 (two tracks), 2005
 t.A.T.u. – Dangerous and Moving ("Craving (I Only Want What I Can't Have)"), 2005
 Delays – "Valentine" (vocal overdub and additional arrangement), 2006 (single)
 Captain – This Is Hazelville, 2006
 Pet Shop Boys – Fundamental, 2006
 Pet Shop Boys – Concrete, 2006
 David Jordan – Set the Mood (six tracks), 2007
 Danny Elfman – Wanted: Original Motion Picture Soundtrack (co-producer, "The Little Things"), 2008
 John Legend – "If You're Out There", 2008 (digital single)
 John Legend – Evolver (co-producer, two tracks), 2008
 Various artists – Israel – Home of Hope (adapting and arranging three tracks), 2008
 Escala – Escala, 2009
 Kid Harpoon – Once, 2009
 Robbie Williams – Reality Killed the Video Star, 2009
 Aviv Geffen – Aviv Geffen (six tracks), 2009

2010s
 Siphiwo – Hope ("Hope", "The Drinking Song", "Ave Maria", "(Something Inside) So Strong", "You'll Never Walk Alone"), 2010
 Rod Stewart – Once in a Blue Moon: The Lost Album, 2010
 The Squad – "Three Lions 2010", 2010 (single)
 Robbie Williams & Gary Barlow – "Shame", 2010 (single)
 Olly Murs – Olly Murs ("A Million More Years"), 2010
 Jeff Beck – Emotion & Commotion (executive producer), 2010
 Blackfield – Welcome to My DNA ("Oxygen"), 2011
 Seal – Soul 2, 2011
 Estelle – All of Me (vocal producer, "Wonderful Life"), 2012
 Donna Lewis – "Always It's You", 2012 (charity single)
 Dog Is Dead – All Our Favorite Stories ("Heal it"), 2012
 Producers: Made in Basing Street, 2012
 Spector – Enjoy It While It Lasts ("Friday Night, Don't Ever Let It End", "Celestine"), 2012
 The Overtones – Higher (five tracks), 2012
 Johnny Borrell – Borrell 1, 2013
 Renato Zero – Amo – Capitolo I (four tracks); Amo – Capitolo II (one track), 2013
 Billy Idol – Kings & Queens of the Underground, 2014
 Spandau Ballet – The Story: The Very Best of Spandau Ballet ("This Is the Love", "Steal", "Soul Boy"), 2014
 Seal – 7, 2015
 Artists for Grenfell – "Bridge Over Troubled Water", 2017 (charity single)
 Renato Zero – Zero Il Folle, 2019
 Rod Stewart with the Royal Philharmonic Orchestra – You're in My Heart, 2019

2020s
 Blackfield – For the Music ("It's So Hard"), 2020
 Clannad – In a Lifetime ("A Celtic Dream", "Who Knows (Where the Time Goes)", 2020

Other work
 Boogatti – "Come Back Marianne" (B-side "Boot Boot Woman" written by Horn), 1977 (single)
 Legacy – 3 Chord Trick (bass), 2017

Samples
 The Prodigy – "Firestarter", 1996 – sampled Art of Noise's "Close (to the Edit)"
 Dua Lipa: Club Future Nostalgia, 2020 – sampled Art of Noise's "Moments in Love"

References

 
Production discographies